MTO may refer to:
 MTO, French mural and graffiti artist, film maker
 MTO, IATA code for Coles County Memorial Airport in Mattoon-Charleston, Illinois
 MTO, National Rail station code for Marton railway station (Middlesbrough), in England 
 MTO (video game company), a Yokohama-based video game developer and publisher founded in May 1996
 MTO, medical timeout, for example in professional tennis
 mto, ISO 639-3 code for the Totontepec Mixe language
 Make to order or made to order, a production approach where products are not built until a confirmed order for products is received
 Mario Tennis Open, a 2012 tennis game for the Nintendo 3DS
 Mars Telecommunications Orbiter, a cancelled Mars mission to enhance communications between Earth and spacecraft on or near Mars
 Mars transfer orbit, also known as trans-Mars injection, a spacecraft maneuver to achieve a trajectory to Mars
 Material take off, an engineering and design term
 Media Take Out, an African-American celebrity gossip website
 Mediterranean Theater of Operations, a World War II area designation
 Methanol to olefins, a technology for generating polymer precursors from methanol
 Methylrhenium trioxide, also called methyltrioxorhenium
 Ministry of Transportation of Ontario, a ministry of the government of Ontario
 Munger, Tolles & Olson, a law firm based in California
 Motor Tax Office, a type of government agency comparable to a Department of Motor Vehicle
 Moving to Opportunity, a US federal housing program
 Multimodal transport operator, an enterprise which moves goods using more than one type of transportation
 Medium-Term budgetary Objective, part of the Stability and Growth Pact (SGP) agreement between member states of the European Union
 Music Theory Online, the online journal of the Society for Music Theory